Kazakhstan competed in the Summer Olympic Games as an independent nation for the first time at the 1996 Summer Olympics in Atlanta, United States. Previously, Kazakhstani athletes competed for the Unified Team at the 1992 Summer Olympics. 96 competitors, 72 men and 24 women, took part in 99 events in 14 sports.

Medalists

Archery

Kazakhstan sent six archers to Atlanta.  Only one, Vadim Chikarev, won a match in the individual round.  Chikarev had competed on the Unified Team in Barcelona.  The women's team defeated the United States in the team round.

Women's Individual Competition:
 Anna Mozhar – Round of 64, 37th place (0-1)
 Irina Leonova – Round of 64, 52nd place (0-1)
 Yana Touniiantse – Round of 64, 58th place (0-1)

Men's Individual Competition:
 Vadim Chikarev – Round of 32, 30th place (1-1)
 Vitaliy Shin – Round of 64, 33rd place (0-1)
 Sergei Martynov – Round of 64, 43rd place (0-1)

Women's Team Competition:
 Mozhar, Leonova, and Touniiantse – Quarterfinal, 8th place (1-1)

Men's Team Competition:
 Chikarev, Shin, and Martynov – Round of 16, 13th place (0-1)

Athletics

Men's 100 metres
Vitaliy Savin
Vitaly Medvedev

Men's 20 km Walk
Valeriy Borisov

Men's 50 km Walk
Sergey Korepanov – 3:48:42 (→ 8th place)

Men's Pole Vault
Igor Potapovich

Men's Triple Jump
Sergey Arzamasov

Men's Shot Put
Sergey Rubtsov

Women's 100 metres
 Nataliya Vorobyova
 Heat - 11.91 (→ did not advance)

Women's 400 metres
 Svetlana Bodritskaya
 Heat – 53.24 (→ did not advance)

Women's 400m Hurdles
Natalya Torshina
 Qualification – 55.94 (→ did not advance)

Women's Long Jump
Yelena Pershina
 Qualification – 6.50m (→ did not advance)

Yelena Koshcheyeva
 Qualification – 5.55m (→ did not advance)

Women's High Jump
 Svetlana Zalevskaya
 Qualification – 1.93m
 Final – 1.93m (→ 14th place)

Women's Shot Put 
 Yelena Baltabayeva 
 Qualification – 16.40m (→ did not advance)

Women's Heptathlon 
 Svetlana Kazanina
 Final Result – 6002 points (→ 18th place)

Women's 10 km Walk
 Svetlana Tolstaya – 45:35 (→ 21st place)
 Maya Sazonova – 47:33 (→ 35th place)

Boxing

Men's Flyweight (– 51 kg)
Bolat Dzhumadilov →  Silver Medal
 First Round – Defeated Vladislav Neiman (Israel), 18-7 
 Second Round – Defeated Serhiy Kovganko (Ukraine), 21-4 
 Quarterfinals – Defeated Damaen Kelly (Ireland), 13-6 
 Semifinals – Defeated Zoltan Lunka (Germany), 23-18 
 Final – Lost to Maikro Romero (Cuba), 11-12

Men's Bantamweight (– 54 kg)
Bektas Abubakirov
 First Round – Lost to Rachid Bouaita (France), 4-10

Men's Featherweight (– 57 kg)
Bakhtiyar Tileganov
 First Round – Lost to Floyd Mayweather (United States), referee stopped contest in second round

Men's Light Welterweight (– 63.5 kg)
Bolat Niyazymbetov →  Bronze Medal
 First Round – Defeated Carlos Martínez  (Mexico), 25-3  
 Second Round – Defeated Davis Mwale (Zambia), 11-3
 Quarterfinals – Defeated Moghimi Babak (Iran), 13-8 
 Semifinals – Lost to Héctor Vinent (Cuba), 6-23

Men's Welterweight (– 67 kg)
Nurzhan Smanov
 First Round – Defeated Lynden Hosking (Australia), referee stopped contest in second round
 Second Round – Defeated Abdul Rasheed Baloch (Pakistan), 13-9 
 Quarterfinals – Lost to Juan Hernández Sierra (Cuba), 8-16

Men's Light Middleweight (– 71 kg)
Yermakhan Ibraimov →  Bronze Medal
 First Round – Defeated Nick Farrell (Canada), 15-4 
 Second Round – Defeated Hendrik Simangunsong (Indonesia), referee stopped contest in first round
 Quarterfinals – Defeated Markus Beyer (Germany), 19-9 
 Semifinals – Lost to Alfredo Duvergel (Cuba), 19-28

Men's Light Heavyweight (– 81 kg)
Vassili Jirov →  Gold Medal
 First Round – Defeated Julio González (Mexico), referee stopped contest in second round
 Second Round – Defeated Pietro Aurino (Italy), 18-13 
 Quarterfinals – Defeated Troy Amos-Ross (Canada), 14-8 
 Semifinals – Defeated Antonio Tarver (United States), 15-9
 Final – Defeated Lee Seung-Bae (South Korea), 17-4

Men's Super Heavyweight (+ 91 kg)
Mikhail Yurchenko
 First Round – Bye
 Second Round – Lost to Alexei Lezin (Russia), referee stopped contest in first round

Canoeing

Cycling

Road competition
Men's Individual Road Race
Andrey Kivilev
Alexander Vinokourov
Aleksandr Shefer
Andrey Teteryuk

Women's Individual Road Race
Alla Vasilenko 
 Final – did not finish (→ no ranking)

Track competition
Men's Points Race
 Sergey Lavrenenko
 Final – 7 points (→ 10th place)

Men's Individual Pursuit (4,000 metres)
 Vadim Kravchenko

Women's Points Race
Alla Vasilenko

Diving

Women's 3m Springboard
Irina Vyguzova
 Preliminary Heat – 276.45
 Semi Final – 202.86
 Final – 273.06 (→ 10th place)

Yelena Ivanova
 Preliminary Heat – 235.50
 Semi Final – 187.20 (→ did not advance, 18th place)

Women's 10m Platform
Irina Vyguzova
 Preliminary Heat – 319.11
 Semi Final – 158.40
 Final – 274.20 (→ 7th place)

Fencing

One male fencer represented Kazakhstan in 1996.

Men's foil
 Vyacheslav Grigoryev

Gymnastics

Judo

Men's Half-Lightweight
Sergey Akhirov

Men's Lightweight
Akhat Akhirov

Men's Half-Middleweight
Ruslan Seilkhanov

Men's Middleweight
Sergey Alimzhanov

Men's Half-Heavyweight
Sergey Shakimov

Men's Heavyweight
Igor Peshkov

Women's Half-Middleweight
Valentina Kamsulyeva

Women's Half-Heavyweight
Yevgeniya Bogunova

Modern pentathlon

Men's Individual Competition:
 Alexandre Paryguin – 5551 pts (→  Gold Medal) 
 Dmitriy Tyurin – 3878 pts (→ 31st place)

Shooting

Men's Rapid-Fire Pistol (25 metres)
Vladimir Vokhmyanin

Men's Air Rifle (10 metres)
Sergey Belyayev

Men's Small-Bore Rifle, Three Positions (50 metres)
Sergey Belyayev

Men's Small-Bore Rifle Prone (50 metres)
Sergey Belyayev

Men's Running Target (10 metres)
Yury Rodnov

Women's Air Pistol (10 metres)
Galina Belyayeva
Yuliya Bondareva

Women's Sporting Pistol (25 metres)
Yuliya Bondareva
Galina Belyayeva

Swimming

Men's 50 m Freestyle
 Sergey Borisenko
 Heat – 23.29 (→ did not advance, 26th place)

Men's 100 m Freestyle
 Aleksey Yegorov
 Heat – 50.49 (→ did not advance, 21st place)

Men's 200 m Freestyle
 Aleksey Yegorov
 Heat – 1:51.66 (→ did not advance, 22nd place)

Men's 100 m Backstroke
 Sergey Ushkalov
 Heat – 58.41 (→ did not advance, 41st place)

Men's 100 m Breaststroke
 Aleksandr Savitsky
 Heat – 1:05.85 (→ did not advance, 38th  place)

Men's 100 m Butterfly
 Andrey Gavrilov
 Heat – 54.56 (→ did not advance, 21st place)

Men's 200 m Individuel Medley
 Aleksandr Savitsky
 Heat – 2:08.78 (→ did not advance, 31st place)

Men's 4 × 100 m Freestyle Relay
Sergey Borisenko, Aleksey Khovrin, Sergey Ushkalov, and Aleksey Yegorov
 Heat – DSQ (→ did not advance, no ranking)

Men's 4 × 100 m Medley Relay
 Sergey Ushkalov, Aleksandr Savitsky, Andrey Gavrilov, and Aleksey Yegorov 
 Heat – 3:49.51 (→ did not advance, 15th place)

Women's 50 m Freestyle
 Yevgeniya Yermakova
 Heat – 25.97 
 B-Final – 26.06 (→ 13th place)

Weightlifting

Wrestling

Men's Light-Heavyweight
Rishat Mansurov
 Final – 155.0 + 182.5 = 337.5 (→ 10th place)

Kuanysh Rymkulov
 Final – DNS (→ no ranking)

Notes

References

Nations at the 1996 Summer Olympics
1996
1996 in Kazakhstani sport